SNPP may refer to:

Real 
 Shoreham Nuclear Power Plant
 Simple Network Paging Protocol
 Smolensk Nuclear Power Plant
 Suomi NPP, an American weather satellite in low earth orbit.

Fictional 
 The Simpsons Archive, domain name snpp.com
 Springfield Nuclear Power Plant